Oesia disjuncta is a monospecific genus known from the Middle Cambrian Burgess Shale. 1147 specimens of Oesia are known from the Greater Phyllopod bed, where they comprise 2.18% of the community.  Despite some similarities to the chaetognaths, its affinity is unknown, though recent data suggest it may be affiliated with hemichordates.

References 

Burgess Shale fossils
Enigmatic prehistoric animal genera

Cambrian genus extinctions